Kosum Phisai is a district (amphoe) in the northern part of Maha Sarakham province, northeastern Thailand.

Geography
Neighboring districts are (from the north clockwise): Chiang Yuen, Kantharawichai, Mueang Maha Sarakham, Borabue, and Kut Rang of Maha Sarakham Province: Ban Phai, Ban Haet, and Mueang Khon Kaen of Khon Kaen province.

Administration

Central administration 
Kosum Phisai is divided into 17 sub-districts (tambons), which are further subdivided into 235 administrative villages (mubans).

Local administration 
There is one sub-district municipality (thesaban tambon) in the district:
 Kosum Phisai consisting of parts of sub-district Hua Khwang.

There are 17 sub-district administrative organizations (SAO) in the district:
 Hua Khwang consisting of parts of sub-district Hua Khwang.
 Yang Noi consisting of sub-district Yang Noi.
 Wang Yao consisting of sub-district Wang Yao.
 Khwao Rai consisting of sub-district Khwao Rai.
 Phaeng consisting of sub-district Phaeng.
 Kaeng Kae consisting of sub-district Kaeng Kae.
 Nong Lek consisting of sub-district Nong Lek.
 Nong Bua consisting of sub-district Nong Bua.
 Lao consisting of sub-district Lao.
 Khuean consisting of sub-district Khuean.
 Nong Bon consisting of sub-district Nong Bon.
 Phon Ngam consisting of sub-district Phon Ngam.
 Yang Tha Chaeng consisting of sub-district Yang Tha Chaeng.
 Hae Tai consisting of sub-district Hae Tai.
 Nong Kung Sawan consisting of sub-district Nong Kung Sawan.
 Loeng Tai consisting of sub-district Loeng Tai.
 Don Klang consisting of sub-district Don Klang.

References

External links

amphoe.com

Kosum Phisai